Francisco "Paquín" Estrada Soto (February 12, 1948 – December 9, 2019) was a Mexican Major League Baseball player for the New York Mets. Estrada, a catcher, appeared in one game for the Mets in 1971. Estrada was at the time of his death the manager of the Chihuahua Dorados in the Mexican League (Summer), and catcher's coach with Culiacán Tomateros in the Mexican Pacific League (Winter). In 2006, he served as the manager of the Mexico national baseball team for the World Baseball Classic.

He was acquired by the Tidewater Tides, then the Mets' Triple-A affiliate, from the Diablos Rojos del México for Orlando McFarlane on November 30, 1970. 

In the United States, he is probably best known for being part of the trade that sent Nolan Ryan and three others, including Estrada, from the New York Mets to the California Angels for Jim Fregosi. However, he was one of the biggest stars in the history of Mexican baseball. While he played in just one game in the major leagues, Estrada holds the minor league record for games caught (2,847), and played for 26 seasons in the Mexican League, beginning his career there in 1966 and ending it in 1994. In his sole major league appearance, Estrada had one hit in two at-bats, giving him a .500 batting average for his career.

Estrada was also a manager in Mexico from 1983 onward. His teams won three Mexican League championships (the Piratas de Campeche in 1983, the Bravos de León in 1990, and the Piratas again in 2004).

In 1989 Piratas de Campeche retired Estrada's number, 25. This was the franchise's first retired number.

Estrada was elected to the Mexican Professional Baseball Hall of Fame in 2000. In 2013, he was enshrined in the Caribbean Baseball Hall of Fame for his notable contribution as player and manager in 13 Caribbean Series.

References

External links 

1948 births
2019 deaths
Águilas de Mexicali players
Alacranes de Campeche players
Angeles de Puebla players
Baseball players from Sonora
Bravos de León players
Caribbean Series managers
Diablos Rojos del México players
Major League Baseball catchers
Major League Baseball players from Mexico
Mayos de Navojoa players
Memphis Blues players
Mexican Baseball Hall of Fame inductees
Mexican expatriate baseball players in the United States
Mexican League baseball catchers
Mexican League baseball managers
Midland Cubs players
Minor league baseball managers
New York Mets players
People from Navojoa
Petroleros de Minatitlán players
Piratas de Campeche players
Rochester Red Wings players
Rojos de San Luis Potosí players
Salt Lake City Angels players
Tidewater Tides players
Tomateros de Culiacán players
Truchas de Toluca players
Venados de Mazatlán players
Yaquis de Obregón players
Wichita Aeros players